is a Japanese short track speed skater. She competed in the women's 500 metres at the 2018 Winter Olympics.

References

External links

 

1996 births
Living people
Japanese female short track speed skaters
Olympic short track speed skaters of Japan
Short track speed skaters at the 2018 Winter Olympics
Short track speed skaters at the 2022 Winter Olympics
Asian Games medalists in short track speed skating
Asian Games bronze medalists for Japan
Short track speed skaters at the 2017 Asian Winter Games
Medalists at the 2017 Asian Winter Games
Place of birth missing (living people)
Short track speed skaters at the 2012 Winter Youth Olympics
Speed skaters at the 2012 Winter Youth Olympics
21st-century Japanese women
World Single Distances Speed Skating Championships medalists